Vilém Gajdušek (1895–1977) was Czech optician and prominent telescope designer.

Asteroid 3603 Gajdušek is named for him.

References

See also
List of astronomical instrument makers

Czech scientists
1895 births
1977 deaths